Brandon Labrosse (born 11 March 1999) is a Seychellois international footballer who plays as a forward for Seychelles First Division club Foresters Mont Fleuri.

References

External links
 

1999 births
Living people
Seychellois footballers
Seychelles international footballers
Association football forwards